Anne West, Lady De La Warr (née Knollys) (19 July 1555 – 30 August 1608) was a lady at the court of Queen Elizabeth I of England.

Biography

Anne Knollys was the third daughter of Sir Francis Knollys, Treasurer of the Royal Household (1514–1596) to Queen Elizabeth I, and his wife Lady Catherine Carey.

Her maternal grandparents were Sir William Carey and Mary Boleyn. Mary was a sister of Anne Boleyn, second wife of Henry VIII of England. Anne Knollys' mother was thus a first cousin of Queen Elizabeth, daughter of Anne Boleyn and Henry VIII. Mary Boleyn had preceded her more famous sister in the King's affections, and had affairs with both Francis I of France and Henry VIII. Both Catherine Carey and Henry Carey may have been Henry's children, although we are unsure of their exact dates of birth. If true, this would make Anne the granddaughter of Henry VIII.

Anne's eldest sister was Lettice Knollys, chief Lady of the Bedchamber to Queen Elizabeth and the mother of the queen's favourite, Robert Devereux, Earl of Essex.

Marriage and issue
Anne Knollys married, on 19 November 1571, Thomas West, 2nd Baron De La Warr, by whom she had six sons and eight daughters:

Sir Robert West, who married Elizabeth Coks and predeceased his father.
Thomas West, 3rd Baron De La Warr (7 July 1577 – c. February 1624), who married Cecily Shirley, youngest daughter of Sir Thomas Shirley and Anne Kempe, daughter of Sir Thomas Kempe of Olantigh, Kent.
Walsingham West.
Francis West (28 October 1586 – c.1634), esquire, Governor of Virginia, who emigrated to Virginia, and married firstly, before 6 February 1626, Margaret, widow of Edward Blayney; secondly, on 31 March 1628, Temperance Flowerdew (d. December 1628), widow of Sir George Yeardley, Governor of Virginia, daughter of Anthony Flowerdew of Hethersett, Norfolk, by Martha Stanley; and thirdly in 1630, Jane Davye, by whom he had a son, Francis West. 
John West (14 December 1590 – 1659), Governor of Virginia, who emigrated to Virginia, and married a wife named Anne Percy, by whom he had a son, John West.
Lieutenant Colonel Nathaniel West (30 November 1592 – 7 June 1618), who emigrated to Virginia, where in 1621 he married Frances Greville (d.1634), by whom he had a son, Nathaniel West. His widow married secondly Abraham Peirsey, esquire (d. 16 January 1628), and thirdly Captain Samuel Mathews, esquire (died c. March 1658).
Elizabeth West (11 September 1573 – 15 January 1633), who married at Wherwell, Hampshire, on 12 February 1594, as his second wife, Herbert Pelham (c.1546 – 12 April 1620), esquire, a widower with two sons and a daughter by his first wife, Katherine Thatcher, by whom she had three sons and six daughters.
Lettice West (b. 1579), who married Henry Ludlow.
Anne West (b. 13 February 1588), who married firstly, by licence dated 30 August 1608, John Pellatt (d. 22 October 1625), esquire, of Bolney, Sussex, by whom she had three daughters; secondly Christopher Swale (d. 7 September 1645), by whom she had a son, Christopher, and a daughter, Elizabeth; and thirdly Leonard Lechford (died c. 29 November 1673), by whom she had no issue.
Penelope West (9 September 1582 – c.1619), who married, about 1599, as his first wife, Herbert Pelham (c.1580 – 13 July 1624)), esquire, of Hastings, Sussex, stepson of Penelope West's elder sister, Elizabeth, by whom she had five sons and four daughters.
Katherine West (b. 1583), who married Nickolas Strelby.
Helen West (b. 15 December 1587), who married Sir William Savage of Winchester, Hampshire, by whom she had a son, John Savage, and two daughters, Cecily and Anne.
Anne West (again).
Elizabeth West (again), who married Sir Richard Saltonstall of Huntwick, Yorkshire.

Related material
The US state of Delaware is named after Anne's son, Thomas West, Baron De La Warre.

Ancestry

Notes

References

"The William and Mary Quarterly, 2nd Ser., Vol. 18, No. 1 (Jan. 1938), pp. 137–138"
"Southside VA Families by John Bennett Boddie Vol 1, Genealogical Pub. 1955, pages 398–402"
"De La Warr, Thomas West, 12th Baron." Encyclopædia Britannica. 2007."
"The Noble Lineage of the Delaware‑West Family of Virginia", by Ann Woodard Fox"
"Colonial Virginia, by Richard L. Morton; University of North Carolina Press, Chapel Hill, NC, 1960, pp 123‑125"

External links
 Anne Knollys
 Tudor Place: The West Family
 Knollys Heraldry

English baronesses
Court of Elizabeth I
Anne
1550s births
1608 deaths
Knollys, Anne
Anne
Anne
People from Test Valley
People from Rotherfield Greys
People from Reading, Berkshire
Burials at Westminster Abbey
16th-century English women
16th-century English nobility
17th-century English women
17th-century English nobility